Ang Pagbabago is a 2006 Philippine television reality show broadcast by GMA Network. Hosted by Diana Zubiri and Alfred Vargas, it premiered on July 10, 2006. The show concluded on September 1, 2006 with a total of 40 episodes.

References

2006 Philippine television series debuts
2006 Philippine television series endings
Filipino-language television shows
GMA Network original programming
GMA Integrated News and Public Affairs shows
Philippine reality television series